James David Garner (born 13 March 2001) is an English professional footballer who plays as a central midfielder for Premier League club Everton and the England under-21 national team.

Born in Merseyside, Garner joined Manchester United's youth system at under-8 level. He made his first-team debut at the age of 17, in a Premier League game against Crystal Palace in February 2019. He spent time on loan at Watford and Nottingham Forest. In the 2021–22 season, he helped Forest gain promotion to the Premier League by winning the play-offs. Garner made seven first-team appearances for United in total, before joining Everton in September 2022.

Garner has represented England from under-17 to under-21 level. He made his debut for the under-21 team in September 2021.

Club career

Manchester United

Youth career 
Garner was born in Birkenhead in Merseyside. He joined the Manchester United Academy at under-8 level. He initially played as a centre-back till the age of 15, before transitioning into midfield. Garner made his first appearances for the Manchester United Under-18s at the end of the 2016–17 season, appearing as a substitute in games against Arsenal and Blackburn Rovers. He signed as an academy scholar in July 2017 and was a regular for the Under-18s in 2017–18, scoring four goals in 24 appearances in all competitions as Manchester United won the Premier League North title; however, he missed the final of the competition against Chelsea as he was on international duty. He also made eight appearances for the Manchester United Under-19s as they made it to the round of 16 of the 2017–18 UEFA Youth League before being eliminated by local rivals Liverpool.

2018–19 season 
Garner first became involved with the Manchester United first team on the club's summer 2018 tour of the United States, starting in the match against San Jose Earthquakes on 22 July, before being replaced by Scott McTominay at half-time. He also made substitute appearances against Real Madrid on 1 August and Bayern Munich on 5 August. With Manchester United's qualification from their 2018–19 UEFA Champions League group secure, Garner was named on the bench for their final group game against Valencia on 12 December, but was not used in the match. He was named as a substitute for Manchester United's 2018–19 FA Cup Third Round tie against Reading on 5 January 2019, but, again, was not brought on.

On 27 February 2019, he made his first-team debut at the age of 17, coming on as a 90th-minute substitute for Fred in a 3–1 league win away to Crystal Palace. On 15 March, Garner signed a contract extension, keeping him at United until June 2022 with an option for a further year.

2019–20 season 
Garner again went on the first team's summer tour in 2019, along with fellow academy players Angel Gomes, Tahith Chong and Mason Greenwood. He came on as a substitute in the 83rd minute of the first pre-season game against Perth Glory, and scored his first senior goal with his first touch within two minutes, a low drive into the bottom right corner from outside the box.

On 24 October 2019, he made his European debut for Manchester United against Partizan in the Europa League.

Loans
Garner signed a season-long loan deal with EFL Championship team Watford in September 2020.
Garner fell out of first-team contention after the appointment of Xisco Muñoz as Watford head coach, and on 30 January 2021, his loan was terminated. On the same day he joined fellow Championship side Nottingham Forest on loan for the remainder of the season. He scored his first goal for the club on 26 February 2021 in a 1-1 draw against arch-rivals Derby County in a league meeting at Pride Park. Following the conclusion of the season, he returned to Manchester United for pre-season training but rejoined Forest for a season-long loan after extending his contract with Manchester United. Garner helped Nottingham Forest gain promotion to the Premier League for the 2022–23 season, playing in their win in the Championship play-off final at Wembley Stadium in May 2022.

Everton
On 1 September 2022, Garner signed for Everton on a four-year deal, a decision which caused substantial backlash from Manchester United fans. The fee was reported to be of £9 million, with add-ons that could increase the fee to £15 million.

International career 
Garner is a youth international and has represented England at under-17, under-18, under-19, under-20 and under-21 levels. Garner captained the under-17 side that reached the semi-finals of the 2018 UEFA European Under-17 Championship. On 13 October 2020, Garner made his debut for the under-20 team during a 2–0 victory over Wales at St. George's Park.

On 27 August 2021, Garner received his first call up at under-21 level. On 7 September 2021, he made his under-21 debut during the 2–0 2023 UEFA European Under-21 Championship qualification win over Kosovo at Stadium MK.

Career statistics

Honours
Nottingham Forest
EFL Championship play-offs: 2022

Individual
Denzil Haroun Reserve Player of the Year: 2019–20

References

External links 

Profile at the Everton F.C. website

2001 births
Living people
Sportspeople from Birkenhead
Footballers from Merseyside
English footballers
Association football midfielders
Manchester United F.C. players
Watford F.C. players
Nottingham Forest F.C. players
Premier League players
English Football League players
England youth international footballers
England under-21 international footballers